Bampur Castle is a historical castle located in Bampur County in Sistan and Baluchestan Province, The longevity of this fortress dates back to the Sasanian Empire.

References 

Castles in Iran
Sasanian castles